Davidovka concentration camp was a Hungarian-controlled World War II labor camp in Davidovka.

References

Nazi concentration camps in Belarus